Alan Frank Beardon (April 16, 1940) is a British mathematician.

Education and career
Beardon obtained his doctorate  at Imperial College London in 1964, supervised by Walter Hayman. In 1970 he was appointed as a lecturer in the Department of Pure Mathematics and Mathematical Statistics at the University of Cambridge, with promotions to readership and professorship until his retirement in 2007. He is an emeritus fellow of St. Catherine's College, Cambridge.

Works
 Creative Mathematics - The Gateway to Research, Cambridge University Press, 2009
 Algebra and Geometry, Cambridge University Press, 2005
 Limits: A New Approach to Real Analysis, Undergraduate Texts in Mathematics, Springer Verlag, 1997
 The geometry of discrete groups, Graduate Texts in Mathematics, Springer Verlag, 1983, 1995
 Iteration of rational functions. Complex analytical dynamical systems, Graduate Texts in Mathematics, Springer Verlag, 1991
 A Primer on Riemann Surfaces, Cambridge University Press, 1984
 Complex analysis: the argument principle in analysis and topology, Wiley, 1979

References

External links
 
 Beardon, Alan Frank at Zentralblatt MATH
 Beardon, Alan F. at WorldCat Identities

1940 births
Living people
20th-century British mathematicians
Academics of the University of Cambridge
Alumni of Imperial College London